Swati Ghate (born 16 January 1980) is an Indian chess player and a Woman Grandmaster.

She is also a winner of the 2006 Indian Chess Championship.

References

External links 
 

1980 births
Living people
Indian female chess players
Chess woman grandmasters
Marathi people
Sportswomen from Maharashtra
21st-century Indian women
21st-century Indian people